HMS Scimitar was a  fast patrol boat of the British Royal Navy. She is a Lifespan Patrol Vessel type boat and formerly served in inland waterway duties in Northern Ireland as MV Grey Fox. She was acquired to serve with the Gibraltar Squadron, tasked with policing, customs and search and rescue duties. This released an  patrol vessel for tasking with the Cyprus Squadron.

Operational history

Scimitar was involved in a diplomatic incident between the United Kingdom and Spain in November 2009 after being alleged by the Spanish to have been using the Spanish flag as a target during gunnery practice. The Ministry of Defence stated that the ship had actually been shooting at a NATO maritime signal flag, which is similar in appearance.

On 3 May 2011 Scimitar was dispatched to intercept the Spanish  patrol boat  when she entered British waters around Gibraltar and ordered the Spanish ship to leave the area. Scimitar took part in another encounter with a Spanish naval vessel on 4 April 2017. It challenged Infanta Cristina, a  that had entered British waters off of Gibraltar. Infanta Cristina left without further incident.

On 8 November 2017, HMS Scimitar intercepted the Spanish corvette Infanta Elena trying to enter British territorial waters off Gibraltar.

Replacement

In July 2017 it was revealed that the Gibraltar Squadron would receive two new warships which will be more "capable", "faster" and have "bigger guns", to replace Sabre and Scimitar "within the next two years".

On 24 July 2020, an announcement was made that the promised two new warships have been ordered from Marine Specialised Technology (MST Ltd) with the first to be delivered in (Q3 2021/22) and the second in (Q1 2022/2023). The contract is expected to cost at least £9.9 million. The patrol vessel replacements are initially going to be armed with X3 General Purpose Machine Guns (1 on the foredeck and 2 on the aft deck) as well as being fitted for but not with a 0.50 cal Heavy Machine Gun.

After a period operating in UK waters Scimitar and Sabre were decommissioned in a joint ceremony at Portsmouth Naval Base on 30 March 2022.

References

External links

 

Scimitar-class patrol vessels
1992 ships